Swift Current Indians may refer to:

Swift Current 57's, a collegiate summer baseball team known as the Indians from 1959-2016
Swift Current Broncos (SJHL), a defunct Junior A hockey team known as the Indians from 1983-86